Audace (D 551) is the lead ship of the Audace-class destroyer of the Italian Navy.

Development  
The design of these ships was related to the previous Impavido-class, but they were meant as a decisive improvement over these older vessels. They hull was more capable to resist high sea conditions, incorporating an aft superstructure used to accommodating two AB-212 anti-submarine warfare (ASW) helicopters. This gave the vessels an ASW capability, with improved sonars and torpedo tubes.

The superstructures were built with aluminium alloys in two blocks with one mack (this is the combination with the funnels supporting metallic, short trees used for radar equipment) each. The distance between the two superstructure blocks was high, as both the propulsion systems were located at midships and over this, the 76 mm gun battery. The aft superstructure was dedicated to the Tartar/SM-1 missiles and hangar.

Due to its anti-aircraft, anti-submarine and anti-ship characteristics, the Ardito was the most modern that had been conceived and built up to then in the field of military naval construction. type, entered service in December 1973.

Construction and career 
She is laid down on 17 April 1968 and launched on 2 October 1971 by Cantiere navale di Riva Trigoso. Commissioned on 16 November 1972 with the hull number D 551 and decommissioned on 28 September 2006.

Audace was the pride of the Navy in the 1970s, it served for 35 years until 2006, it was sent to Aliaga to be demolished on 7 May 2018.

Gallery

References

External links
 Audace (D 551) Marina Militare website

Audace-class destroyers
1971 ships
Destroyers of the Cold War